The New Zealand Bill of Rights Act 1990 (sometimes known by its acronym, NZBORA or simply BORA) is a statute of the Parliament of New Zealand part of New Zealand's uncodified constitution that sets out the rights and fundamental freedoms of anyone subject to New Zealand law as a bill of rights, and imposes a legal requirement on the attorney-general to provide a report to parliament whenever a bill is inconsistent with the bill of rights.

The High Court of New Zealand in Taylor v Attorney-General issued an unprecedented declaration that the restriction on prisoners voting rights was a limit on their right to vote in genuine periodic elections, and that it had not been unjustified under NZBORA. On appeal, the Supreme Court later confirmed that senior courts had jurisdiction to make such a declaration, and in 2022 a law was passed to establish procedures to allow and require the New Zealand Government a reporting and response mechanism to inconsistency declarations.

History
In 1985, Minister of Justice Geoffrey Palmer tabled in Parliament a document titled A Bill of Rights for New Zealand: A White Paper. The paper proposed a number of controversial features, which sparked widespread debate:
 The Bill of Rights was to become entrenched law so that it could not be amended or repealed without a 75% majority vote in the House of Representatives or a simple majority in a public referendum;
The Bill of Rights was to therefore have status as supreme law, thereby causing some erosion to the doctrine of parliamentary sovereignty;
The Treaty of Waitangi was to be wholly incorporated within the Bill of Rights thus elevating the Treaty's status to that of supreme law;
The Judiciary would have the power to invalidate any Act of Parliament, common law rule or official action which was contrary to the Bill of Rights.
 
The Bill then went to the Justice and Law Reform Select Committee, which recommended that New Zealand was "not yet ready" for a Bill of Rights in the form proposed by the White Paper. The Committee recommended that the Bill of Rights be introduced as an ordinary statute, which would not have the status of superior or entrenched law.

In its current form, the Bill of Rights is similar to the Canadian Bill of Rights, passed in 1960. The Act does create an atmospheric change in New Zealand law in that it provides judges the means to "interpret around" other acts to ensure enlarged liberty interests. The Bill of Rights has a liberty-maximising clause much like the Ninth Amendment to the United States Constitution, and this provides many opportunities for creative interpretation in favour of liberties and rights.

Application of the Bill of Rights
The Act applies only to acts done by the three branches of government (the legislature, executive and judiciary) of New Zealand, or by any person or body in the "performance of any public function, power, or duty" imposed by the law.

In section 4 of the Act, it explicitly denies the Bill of Rights any supremacy over other legislation. The section states that Courts looking at cases under the Act cannot implicitly repeal or revoke, or make invalid or ineffective, or decline to apply any provision of any statute made by parliament, whether before or after the Act was passed because it is inconsistent with any provision of this Bill of Rights. However, in contrast, where another Act can be interpreted that is consistent with the bill of rights, the courts are obliged to use the most consistent interpretation through section 6 of NZBORA.

Further, in section 5, one of the core provisions in the Act allows for 'justified limitations' on the rights guaranteed throughout the bill of rights. It says that the rights are "subject only to such reasonable limits prescribed by law as can be demonstrably justified in a free and democratic society", which is the same wording as in Canada's Charter of Rights and Freedoms.

Reports of the attorney-general 

Under section 7 of the bill of rights, the attorney-general legally required to draw to the attention of parliament the introduction of any bill that is inconsistent with the bill of rights. The Ministry of Justice, which prepares this advice for the attorney-general, requires a minimum of two weeks to review the draft legislation.

Civil and Political Rights 

Part II of the Act covers a broad range of Civil and Political Rights.

Life and the Security of the Person
As part of the right to life and security of the person, the Act guarantees everyone:
The right not to be deprived of life except in accordance with fundamental justice (Section 8)
The right not to be subjected to torture or to cruel, degrading, or disproportionately severe treatment or punishment (Section 9)
The right not to be subjected to medical or scientific experimentation without  consent (Section 10)
The right to refuse to undergo any medical treatment except in the case of involuntary commitment (Section 11)

Democratic and Civil Rights
Electoral Rights
The Act sets out the electoral rights of New Zealanders. The Act guarantees that every New Zealand citizen who is of or over the age of 18 years has:
The right to vote in elections of members of Parliament, which shall be held by equal suffrage and by secret ballot (Section 12(a))
Has the right to become a member of the House of Representatives (Section 12(b))
Furthermore, the Act guarantees everyone:
Freedom of Thought, Conscience, and Religion
The right to freedom of thought, conscience, religion, and belief, including the right to adopt and hold opinions without interference (Section 13)
Freedom of expression
The right to freedom of expression, including the freedom to seek, receive, and impart information and opinions of any kind in any form (Section 14)
Religion and Belief
The right to manifest that person's religion or belief in worship, observance, practice, or teaching, either individually or in community with others, and either in public or in private (Section 15)
Assembly
The right of peaceful assembly (Section 16)
Association
The right to freedom of association (Section 17)
Movement
The right to freedom of movement and residence in New Zealand. (Section 18(1))
The Act guarantees to every New Zealand citizen:
The right to enter New Zealand (Section 18(2))
The Act guarantees everyone:
The right to leave New Zealand (Section 18(3))
The Act also (Section 18(4)) ensures that non-New Zealand citizens lawfully in New Zealand shall not be required to leave except under a decision taken on grounds prescribed by law.

Non-Discrimination and Minority Rights 
Section 19 of the Act guarantees freedom from discrimination, on the grounds of discrimination set out in the Human Rights Act 1993. Section 20 provides protection for the culture, religion, and language of individuals who belong to ethnic, religious and linguistic minorities.

Search, Arrest, and Detention
The Act guarantees everyone:
The right to be secure against unreasonable search or seizure, whether of the person, property, or correspondence, or otherwise (Section 21)
The right not to be arbitrarily arrested or detained (Section 22)
Everyone who is arrested or who is detained has the right to:
Be informed at the time of the arrest or detention of the reason for it; and
Consult and instruct a lawyer without delay and to be informed of that right; and
Have the validity of the arrest or detention determined without delay by way of habeas corpus and to be released if the arrest or detention is not lawful.
Everyone who is arrested for an offence has the right to be charged promptly or to be released. 
Everyone who is arrested or detained for any offence or suspected offence shall have the right to:
Refrain from making any statement and to be informed of that right.
Everyone deprived of liberty has the right to be treated with humanity and with respect for the inherent dignity of the person (Section 23).

Criminal Justice
The Act requires that everyone who is charged with an offence:
Shall be informed promptly and in detail of the nature and cause of the charge; and
Shall be released on reasonable terms and conditions unless there is just cause for continued detention; and
Shall have the right to consult and instruct a lawyer; and
Shall have the right to adequate time and facilities to prepare a defence; and
Shall have the right, except in the case of an offence under military law tried before a military tribunal, to the benefit of a trial by jury when the penalty for the offence is or includes imprisonment for more than 3 months; and
Shall have the right to receive legal assistance without cost if the interests of justice so require and the person does not have sufficient means to provide for that assistance; and
Shall have the right to have the free assistance of an interpreter if the person cannot understand or speak the language used in court. (Section 24)

Fair Trial
Everyone who is charged with an offence has the minimum right:
To a fair and public hearing by an independent and impartial court;
To be tried without undue delay;
To be presumed innocent until proved guilty according to law;
Not to be compelled to be a witness or to confess guilt;
To be present at the trial and to present a defence;
To examine the witnesses for the prosecution and to obtain the attendance and examination of witnesses for the defence under the same conditions as the prosecution;
If convicted of an offence in respect of which the penalty has been varied between the commission of the offence and sentencing, to the benefit of the lesser penalty;
If convicted of the offence, to appeal according to the law to a higher court against the conviction or against the sentence or against both:
In the case of a child, to be dealt with in a manner that takes account of the child's age (Section 25)

Double Jeopardy
Section 26 covers instances of double jeopardy. The Act holds that:
No one shall be liable to conviction of any offence on account of any act or omission which did not constitute an offence by such person under the law of New Zealand at the time it occurred.
No one who has been finally acquitted or convicted of, or pardoned for, an offence shall be tried or punished for it again.

Natural justice
Section 27 of the Act guarantees everyone the right to the observance of the principles of natural justice by any tribunal or other public authority which has the power to make a determination in respect of that person's rights, obligations, or interests protected or recognised by law. Every person also has the right to bring civil proceedings against, and to defend civil proceedings brought by, the Crown, and to have those proceedings heard, according to law, in the same way as civil proceedings between individuals.

Important court cases
A large number of cases have been heard under the Act since it was passed in 1990, mostly pertaining to rights around arrest and detention.

In 1993, the Court of Appeal held in the Flickinger v Crown Colony of Hong Kong case that section 66 of the Judicature Act 1908, which denied the right of appeal in extradition cases such as this one, was to be interpreted in light of section six of the Act. Nonetheless, the Court held in this case the bill of rights had not been breached, and the appellant, Flickinger, had to return to Hong Kong to face charges.

In 1994, the Court of Appeal heard Simpson v Attorney-General (also known as Baigent's case), the plaintiffs represented by leading human rights barrister Antony Shaw alleged that police officers had persisted in bad faith with the search of the late Mrs Baigent's house when they knew that her property had been mistakenly named in a search warrant issued for a drug dealers' house. The plaintiffs sued on the grounds the police breached section 21 of the Bill of Rights Act which provides for the right to be secure against unreasonable search and arrest. 

In the case, four out of five of the Court of Appeal's benches held that the fact that the bill of rights did not include a specific remedies section did not mean parliament did not intend to compensate for breaches of the Act, and that for the case the bill of rights had to be interpreted in light of New Zealand's obligations under the ICCPR. They further held that the courts could award remedies for breaches of the bill of right and determined the liability of breaches of the bill of rights fell on the Crown.

In 2003, Paul Hopkinson, a Wellington schoolteacher, burned the Flag of New Zealand as part of a protest in Parliament grounds at the New Zealand Government's hosting of the Prime Minister of Australia, against the background of Australia's support of the United States in its war in Iraq. Hopkinson was initially convicted in Hopkinson v Police under Flags, Emblems, and Names Protection Act 1981 of destroying a New Zealand flag with intent to dishonour it but appealed against his conviction. On appeal, his conviction was overturned on the grounds that the law had to be read consistently with the right to freedom of expression under the Bill of Rights. This meant that his actions were not unlawful because the word dishonour in the Flags, Emblems and Names Protection Act had many shades of meaning and, when the least restrictive meaning of that word was adopted, Hopkinson's actions did not meet that standard. This somewhat unusual result was due in part to the fact that the Bill of Rights does not overrule other laws.

Remedies under the Bill of Rights Act 1990

The Bill of Rights Act 1990 does not provide express remedies for when one of the rights contained in the Act has been breached. Despite this, the Court of Appeal has held on several occasions that it has the jurisdiction to develop remedies as it sees fit. The focus of Bill of Rights Act remedies is to provide vindication in such a way that upholds the importance of the right, rather than invokes punishment for its breach. As such, court decisions can often include a combination of remedies in order for the breached right to be properly vindicated.

Exclusion of evidence
A common remedy to the Bill of Rights Act 1990 is that the evidence obtained through breaching a right is inadmissible in court. This initially developed in the courts as a presumption of exclusion but was subsequently lessened to a balancing exercise where various factors are weighed up to determine the admissibility of evidence tainted by a breach of the Bill of Rights Act 1990. This remedy is now reflected in section 30 of the Evidence Act 2006.

Reduction in sentence
A reduction in sentence can be granted as a remedy in cases where s25(b) of the Bill of Rights Act 1990 has been breached: the right to be tried without undue delay. In Williams v R [2009] NZSC 41, the Supreme Court held that a reduction in sentence was a more appropriate remedy than a stay of proceedings, except for extremely minor offending.

Costs
The regular rule that costs will follow the event is not always the case under the Bill of Rights Act 1990. In some cases, the court can reduce costs for claims under the Act that were worthy, even if they were ultimately unsuccessful.

Compensation
In Simpson v Attorney-General (Baigent’s Case) (1994) 1 HRNZ 42, the Court of Appeal awarded compensation under the Bill of Rights Act 1990. This was a new remedy under the Act. In this case, the plaintiffs were seeking damages for a search warrant executed on their place of residence that was obtained on the basis of incorrect information. The police were informed that the warrant was based on false information, but they continued with the search nonetheless. The Court of Appeal held that the Court had an inherent jurisdiction to develop remedies under the Bill of Rights Act 1990, and that compensation was an appropriate remedy in this case. Cooke P stated that the court would “fail in our duty if we did not give an effective remedy to a person whose legislatively affirmed rights have been infringed.” The Court of Appeal thus held that there is a public law action available against the Crown for a breach of the Bill of Rights Act 1990. It is likely to only be available to those who do not attain a suitable alternative remedy for a breach of the Act. 

Compensation under NZBORA is discretionary and the Supreme Court of New Zealand has emphasised that it is just one of many public law remedies and that non-monetary remedies will often be more appropriate. Indeed, there are relatively few examples of where compensation for violations of NZBORA have been awarded. In Udompun v Attorney General, Glazebrook J of the Court of Appeal stated that monetary compensation will not be awarded where a more suitable remedy exists. Most significantly, in Taunoa v Attorney-General the Supreme Court of New Zealand awarded compensatory damages for breaches of NZBORA by the Department of Corrections’ Behaviour Management Regime.

Exemplary damages
It is often cited that exemplary damages are an inappropriate remedy under the Act, because the focus should be on compensation rather than punishment. Exemplary damages were awarded in Archbold v Attorney-General [2003] NZAR 563, but William Young J qualified this remedy by stating that he would alternatively have awarded the same amount as public law compensation for the breach. Whether a court can award exemplary damages for a public claim of a breach of the Bill of Rights Act 1990 is therefore uncertain.

Declaration of inconsistency
A declaration of inconsistency is a remedy in the form of a formal declaration by a court of law that legislation is inconsistent with a right contained in the Bill of Rights Act 1990. It was first made available as a remedy following the litigation in Taylor v Attorney-General [2015] 3 NZLR.

The first suggestion that a declaration of inconsistency could be available was in 1992. Following this, Temese v Police (1992) C CRNZ 425 and Quilter v Attorney-General (1998) 1 NZLR 153 both suggested that it could be available in the appropriate case, but fell short of making a declaration. In Moonen v Film and Literature Board of Review [2000] 2 NZLR 9, Tipping J stated that the courts had a duty to indicate when legislation was inconsistent with the Bill of Rights Act 1990, but it was unclear whether he meant a formal declaration of inconsistency or a mere indication of inconsistency contained within the judgment. In R v Poumako [2000] 2 NZLR 695, Thomas J dissented by making a formal declaration of inconsistency. It followed in Zaoui v Attorney-General [2005] 1 NZLR 577 that the Court held that Moonen and Poumako had established a jurisdiction for courts to issue a formal declaration of inconsistency. However, in R v Hansen [2007] NZSC 7, while the Court of Appeal established that courts could inquire into the consistency of legislation with the Bill of Rights Act 1990, they did not make a formal declaration of inconsistency. 

In July 2015, Heath J at the High Court of Auckland in Taylor v Attorney-General issued a formal declaration of inconsistency that an electoral law amendment introduced by the Fifth National Government that removed the ability of inmates voting rights (section 80(1)(d) Electoral Act 1993) was an unjustified limitation under section 12(a) of the bill of rights, which prescribes voting rights to all citizens aged 18 years and over. This was the first declaration of inconsistency in New Zealand. 

This was appealed to the Court of Appeal by the Attorney-General who argued that the Court had no jurisdiction to issue a declaration of inconsistency unless it was expressly authorised by legislation, the Court of Appeal called this a “bold argument” and said that “inconsistency between statutes is a question of interpretation…and it lies within the province of the courts." Furthermore Speaker of the House David Carter in the case challenged the use of parliamentary proceedings in the High Court decision and argued that this was a breach of parliamentary privilege. In its ruling, concluded that no breach of parliamentary privilege occurred and that senior courts had the jurisdiction to make a declaration of inconsistency. This was then further appealed by the Attorrney-General to the Supreme Court which dismissed the appeal and upheld the judgment by the Court of Appeal. As such, declarations of inconsistency are an available remedy under the Bill of Rights Act 1990.

On 29 August 2022, the New Zealand Bill of Rights (Declarations of Inconsistency) Amendment Act 2022 received Royal assent and commenced on the same day. The amendment act introduced a legal requirement for the Attorney-General to notify parliament when a declaration of inconsistency is made, and further that the responsible Minister must present a report to parliament that details the government's response to the declaration. On 21 November 2022, the Supreme Court in Make It 16 Incorporated v Attorney-General affirmed the jurisdiction confirmed by the court in Attorney-General v Taylor and noted the passing of the amendment act.

Other remedies
Several other remedies were suggested to be available in R v Taylor (1996) 14 CRNZ 426. These included a reduction in the penalty, police disciplinary proceedings, criminal prosecution, a declaration, or future-looking relief. Other remedies have included special jury directions, and orders that witness testimony be disregarded. It can often depend on the nature of the right breached as to what remedy will be appropriate to vindicate that breach.

The future of bill of rights remedies
Article 2(3) of the International Covenant on Civil and Political Rights requires parties to the treaty to ensure that any person whose rights and freedoms have been breached to have an effective remedy. It is often argued by New Zealand academics that the lack of express remedies in the Bill of Rights Act does not meet this requirement. One such express remedy is a judicial power to strike down legislation that is inconsistent with the Bill of Rights Act 1990. This is similar to the powers of the Court under the Canadian Charter of Rights and Freedoms.

It is an ongoing conversation amongst legal academics in New Zealand as to whether there should be an entrenched constitutional bill of rights that gives the court the power to strike down inconsistent legislation. This would provide a remedy to breaches of the Bill of Rights Act 1990 as the courts could uphold the right, rather than finding it to be subservient to the contradictory legislation under s4. The UN Human Rights Committee criticised New Zealand for the lack of court power to strike down legislation inconsistent with the Bill of Rights Act 1990. They equated this lack of power with a lack of human rights protection. Geoffrey Palmer and Andrew Butler published a book in 2016 entitled A Constitution for Aotearoa New Zealand that laid out a proposed entrenched bill of rights, including a judicial power of strike down. This was intended to start a conversation in New Zealand as to whether entrenching their bill of rights in a constitution was the way forward.

The resistance to an entrenched bill of rights in New Zealand is partly because the country is currently governed by parliamentary sovereignty. Giving the courts the power to strike down Parliament’s legislation would be contrary to the doctrine of parliamentary supremacy. There is also resistance because the protection of human rights is not regarded as the courts’ responsibility, but instead seen as requiring involvement by all branches of government.

See also
Constitution of New Zealand
New Zealand Human Rights Commission

References

External links
 New Zealand Bill of Rights Act 1990
 Ministry of Justice pamphlet on the Bill of Rights (PDF)
 Public Address: A Clayton's Bill of Rights
 New Zealand Herald: Bill of Rights unlikely to grow up
 A Constitution for Aotearoa New Zealand

Constitution of New Zealand
National human rights instruments
Statutes of New Zealand
1990 in New Zealand law
Human rights in New Zealand